The 1972 United States Senate election in Delaware was held November 7, 1972. Incumbent Republican United States Senator J. Caleb Boggs ran for a third term in the United States Senate. Boggs faced off against Democrat Joe Biden, a New Castle County Councilman. Though Boggs was expected to easily win a third term, Biden narrowly defeated the incumbent on election day, even while fellow Democrat George McGovern lost Delaware by 20.4% in the concurrent presidential election. Biden's victory margin of 3,162 votes made this the closest U.S. Senate election of the year. Biden won a total of seven terms in the Senate, before being elected vice president in 2008 and in 2012 and president in 2020. At the age of 29, Biden became the youngest person to be elected senator since Rush Holt won in West Virginia in 1934. This is the only time that Biden has lost Sussex County in his seven elections to the Senate, though he has lost the county in all his vice presidential and presidential elections.

General election
Longtime Delaware political figure and incumbent Republican Senator J. Caleb Boggs was considering retirement, which would likely have left U.S. Representative Pete du Pont and Wilmington Mayor Harry G. Haskell Jr. in a divisive Senate primary fight. To avoid a potential primary, U.S. President Richard Nixon helped convince Boggs to run again with full party support.

Aside from Biden, a New Castle County Councilman, no Democrat wanted to challenge Boggs. Biden's campaign had virtually no money and was given no chance of winning. The campaign was managed by Biden's sister, Valerie Biden Owens (who managed his future campaigns), was staffed by other members of the Biden family, and relied upon handed-out newsprint position papers. Biden did receive some assistance from the AFL–CIO and from Democratic pollster Patrick Caddell. Biden's campaign focused on withdrawal from the Vietnam War, the environment, civil rights, mass transit, more equitable taxation, health care, the public's dissatisfaction with politics-as-usual, and "change". Biden also opposed giving amnesty to draft dodgers. Despite not supporting the legalization of marijuana, he said in a campaign ad that: "the possession of marijuana is a misdemeanor—a minor offense. The police should treat it that way, and devote the greater part of their efforts to heroin.".

During the summer, Biden trailed Boggs by almost 30 percentage points; however, Biden's energy level, attractive young family, and ability to connect with voters' emotions gave him an advantage over the ready-to-retire Boggs. John Marttila served as one of his consultants and had previously worked for Robert Drinan's campaign for the U.S. House of Representatives. Biden's campaign was described as having "no money to speak of" and relied on position papers in newspapers and a few campaign advertisements on the radio. One notable advertisement used by the Biden campaign was a brochure printed in newspaper format that contrasted the world view of the two candidates, e.g. (full page) "To Cale Boggs an unfair tax was the 1948 poll tax"; (opposite page) "To Joe Biden an unfair tax is the 1972 income tax." On November 7, 1972, Biden upset Boggs by a margin of 3,162 votes.

Biden varied his messaging during campaign events throughout the state as well. For example, in the southern parts of the state his pitch was: "thirty years ago, caring for the environment meant picking up bottles and beer cans on Rehoboth Beach … and now it means saving the beach." whereasin the northern parts of the state in the Wilmington area it was "in 1950, Cale Boggs promised to keep highways growing; in 1970 Joe Biden promises to keep trees growing.".

A few weeks later on December 18, 1972, Biden's wife and daughter died in a car crash which injured his sons. Biden contemplated resigning the Senate seat and told his brother to talk with governor-elect Sherman W. Tribbitt on his successor. Senate Majority Leader Mike Mansfield persuaded Biden to stay in the Senate for at least six months. Biden was sworn in at the hospital where his sons were recovering. Biden held the seat up until his election as Vice President 36 years later.

At the time of the 1972 election, Biden was 29 years old. He turned 30—the minimum age for a U.S. senator—on November 20, 1972, in time for the Senate term beginning January 3, 1973. At the commencement of his Senate term, Biden was the sixth-youngest U.S. Senator in history.

A 2004 book contained a story, allegedly from Frank Sheeran, that in the week prior to Election Day, an unidentified lawyer approached Sheeran about preventing the distribution of the local paper because Senator Boggs was running an advertisement unflattering to Biden. Sheeran claimed that he organized a work stoppage, and that Teamsters truck drivers refused to cross a picket line, so the papers were not delivered. The credibility of Sheeran's account has been called into question, although an article published in The New York Times on Friday November 3, 1972, does seem to confirm that a work stoppage took place four days prior to election day, preventing the delivery of a single Friday edition of local paper The Morning News.

There were two other candidates in the 1972 Senate election: Henry M. Majka and Herbert B. Wood. Majka came from the American Party while Wood hailed from the Prohibition Party. Majka managed to receive 803 votes, or 0.3% of the vote, while Wood got 175 votes, or 0.1% of the vote.

Biden was elected President of the United States in November 2020 at age 77. Because of mail-in voting his victory was not official until November 7, five days after conventional voting began and the 48th anniversary of his Senate election over Boggs.

Candidates 

 Joe Biden (Democratic Party), New Castle County council member
 J. Caleb Boggs (Republican Party), incumbent senator and former Governor of Delaware
 Henry M. Majka (American Party)
 Herbert B. Wood (Prohibition Party)

Results

County results

Results by state representative district

See also 
 1972 United States Senate elections

References

1972
Delaware
1972 Delaware elections
s